Kamouraska—Rivière-du-Loup—Témiscouata—Les-Basques (formerly known as Kamouraska—Rivière-du-Loup—Témiscouata) was a federal electoral district in Quebec, Canada, that was represented in the House of Commons of Canada from 1997 to 2004.

This riding was created in 1996 as "Kamouraska—Rivière-du-Loup—Témiscouata" from parts of Kamouraska—Rivière-du-Loup riding. Its name was changed in 1997 to "Kamouraska—Rivière-du-Loup—Témiscouata—Les Basques".

It consisted of:
the cities of Cabano, Dégelis, La Pocatière, Notre-Dame-du-Lac, Pohénégamook, Rivière-du-Loup, Saint-Pascal and Trois-Pistoles;
 the County Regional Municipality of Rivière-du-Loup, including Cacouna Indian Reserve No. 22 and Whitworth Indian Reserve; and
 the county regional municipalities of Kamouraska, Les Basques and Témiscouata.

It was abolished in 2003 when it was redistributed into Rivière-du-Loup—Montmagny and Rimouski—Témiscouata ridings. Its only Member of Parliament was Paul Crête of the Bloc Québécois.

Members of Parliament

Election results

See also 

 List of Canadian federal electoral districts
 Past Canadian electoral districts

External links 
 Riding history for Kamouraska—Rivière-du-Loup—Temiscouata from the Library of Parliament
Riding history for Kamouraska—Rivière-du-Loup—Temiscouata—Les Basques from the Library of Parliament

Former federal electoral districts of Quebec
Rivière-du-Loup